Oonche Log is an Indian Hindi-language film directed by Brij. The film stars Rajesh Khanna, Salma Agha as the main lead characters. This film is inspired by the novel Wuthering Heights, the 1966 film Dil Diya Dard Liya and the Pakistani film Dehleez (1983), starring Nadeem, Shabnam, Afzal Ahmed and Agha Taalish. The film's cinematography, music of R. D. Burman, performance of Rajesh Khanna, Danny Denzongpa, Prem Chopra were critically praised, but Salma Agha's performance was criticised.

Cast
 Rajesh Khanna as Jagdev Singh / Rai Bahadur Rajdev Singh / Raju
 Salma Agha as Poonam Singh
 Pradeep Kumar as Thakur Vikram Singh
 Prem Chopra as Thakur Pratap Singh
 Danny Denzongpa as Thakur Maan Singh
 Deven Verma as Mubarak Ali
 Raza Murad as Khan
 Priti Sapru as Sonia
 Pinchoo Kapoor as Rai Bahadur

Soundtrack
The music was composed by R. D. Burman. Brij insisted on using the same tune and lyrics of "Aaj Tu Gair Sahi" of the Pakistani film Dehleez, sung by Mehdi Hasan, in this film the same song was recorded with Kishore Kumar. This version with orchestration by R. D. Burman was appreciated.

Track listing
Lyrics: Anjaan

References

External links
 

1985 films
Indian romantic drama films
1985 romantic drama films
1980s Hindi-language films
Films scored by R. D. Burman
Indian remakes of Pakistani films
Films directed by Brij Sadanah